Carex platyphylla, called the broad leaf sedge and silver sedge, is a species of flowering plant in the genus Carex, native to southeast Canada, and the north-central and eastern United States. It is often found in the same forests as Carex plantaginea, also a broad-leaved species, but they do not compete, as C.plantaginea prefers wet areas and C.platyphylla prefers it dry. Silver sedge is considered a useful native ornamental, since it is showy, deer-resistant, and able to tolerate both deep shade and drought once established.

References

platyphylla
Plants described in 1847